NISS may refer to:

 National Intelligence and Security Service, an Ethiopian Government agency which gathers information and is tasked with preserving national interest. 
 National Institute of Statistical Sciences, an American institute that researches statistical science and quantitative analysis
 the National Intelligence and Security Service, the former intelligence service of Sudan, renamed/reorganised in 2019 as the General Intelligence Service (Sudan)
 Nexus International School Singapore
 Nordic Institute of Stage and Studio
 Charles Niss (1861–1938), American politician and businessman
 Thorvald Niss (1842–1905), Danish painter